Wild Heart is the third studio album by American singer-songwriter Samantha Fish. It was released on June 14, 2015.

The album was produced by Luthar Dickinson. It was recorded at Blade Studios in Shreveport, Louisiana, with additional recordings at Ardent Studios, Zebra Ranch and Royal Recording Studios, Memphis.

Critical reception 
Marty Guntar writing for Blues Blast Magazine described it as having a "superstar lineup" and that "the end product is head-and-shoulders her best", stating that he "Highly recommended" the album.

Bill Brownlee writing for NPR in Kansas City wrote positively about the album, describing the songs as "sturdy" while praising Fish's guitar work and vocal strength. He also praised the production work of Luthar Dickinson noting that Luthar gave the band a "house-rocking sound". He was however critical of the decision to market the album as blues rather than rock, which he felt was limiting for her career.

Track listing

Personnel 
Adapted from the album's liner notes.

 Samantha Fish – vocals, lead guitar
 Luther Dickinson – bass guitar (1, 2, 3, 4, 7, 10, 11), lap steel guitar (2, 3, 9), guitar (2, 3, 5, 7, 9, 11, 12), mandolin (6)
 Brady Blade – drums (1, 2, 3, 4, 5, 7, 8, 9, 10, 11)
 Rissie Norman – vocals (1, 2, 4, 5, 10, 11)
 Shontelle Norman-Beatty – vocals (1, 2, 4, 5, 10, 11)
 Sharde Thomas – drums (5, 6, 12), vocals (12)
 Lightnin' Malcolm – guitar (6)
 Dominic Davis – bass guitar (8)

Other staff:

 Ruben M Williams – Executive producer
 Thomas Ruf – Executive producer
 Chris Bell – engineer, mixer
 Brad Blackwood – mastering
 Adam Hill – recording
 Boo Mitchell – recording
 Kevin Houston – recording
 Dennis Gatz – photography 
 Queens-Design.de – artwork

Charts

References 

2015 albums
Samantha Fish albums